Indiana Jones and the Philosopher's Stone is the ninth of 12 Indiana Jones novels published by Bantam Books. Max McCoy, the author of this book, also wrote three of the other Indiana Jones books for Bantam. Published on April 1, 1995, it is preceded by Indiana Jones and the White Witch and followed by Indiana Jones and the Dinosaur Eggs.

Plot introduction
Indiana Jones hunts down an English alchemist, a Renaissance scholar and a stolen manuscript containing the great alchemical secrets of immortality and transmuting base metals to gold.

The book was published only in paperback by Bantam Books of New York City in April 1995.

Plot summary

The novel begins with Indiana Jones descending down a hillside towards the lost city of Cozán, in the rain forests of Central America. After deciphering the clues in the pyramid, he discovers the Crystal Skull of Cozán and retrieves it, only for the artifact to be snatched away by the main antagonist, Leonardo Sarducci. Sarducci tells Indiana Jones his plan to achieve immortality and orders his partner, Marco, to kill the archeologist. A giant snake eats Marco and Indiana Jones escapes from the temple and returns to a village with his guide, who accompanied him in the expedition.

Jones returns to Princeton University where Marcus informs him of the stolen Voynich Manuscript. Government men visit Jones and try to recruit him into helping them find the mysterious manuscript, but Jones declines. It is revealed that the men said to Jones's superiors about his expedition in Central America being illegal, and Jones is inevitably fired and sanctioned from his job as professor. After searching for a place to sleep, Jones then comes across a bookstore owner who claims to be an enthusiast in alchemist history. He reveals to Jones that the fascists visited him too in search for the manuscript, and that they are also searching for the Philosopher's Stone, an artifact that can turn any metal to gold. Jones contacts the US Government and hurriedly catches up to the USS Macon, dangling from a rope attached to the airship. He foils assassination attempts by Italians onboard.

Jones arrives in England for Alistair Dunstin, but instead finds his sister, Alecia. Jones eventually ends up in Alecia's apartment. Just then, the Fascists arrive and make an attempt on the pair's life. Indy and Alecia escape and the archaeologist learns that Alecia is the last of a dying race of secret metal workers and has a tattoo on her back which is said to hold the key to deciphering the Voynich Manuscript. He is also informed about the history of the stone and that Alistair and Alecia have successfully transmutated substance into gold. She tells him that a prima material is needed to fuel the stone and that there isn't much time if they want to find Alistair alive. The Fascists catch up and, after a daring shootout in the back alleys of London, the two escape with their lives and new found feelings for each other.

Alecia books a garbage freighter for passage to Italy, in hopes that Alistair is there. When Indy joins her, Sarducci appears once again to kill them both. After dumping the load of garbage into the ocean with Indy and Alecia inside, the pair makes their way to one of the flying boats that is part of the Italian air armada AKA The Atlantici that is allowing Sarducci to travel around the globe so fast. The pair make it to Italy where they encounter Sarducci in his office and ask where Alistair is being held. Because Alecia bares a strong resemblance to his deceased wife, Sarducci releases them and accidentally gives them a clue which leads them to Libya where they meet with Sallah.

In the middle of the Libyan desert, on the border to Egypt, the trio meets Prince Farqhuar who leads his rebel army to battle with the "roman pigs". Indy sneaks into the secret Italian base and finds Alistair. The pair sneak out only to be caught when Alistair reveals he was working with the Italians all along. Sarducci plans to execute Indy via firing squad but Prince Farqhuar saves him at the last minute. They survive a sandstorm and Indy decodes the map on Alecia's back.

They arrive at the hiding place of the Philosopher's Stone and Indy and Alistair swim down to retrieve it. Sarducci arrives and takes the group prisoner, stows them in a van and his servant and he open the mechanism and activate the Stone. The stone melts his assistant after they touch it and soon Sarducci finds himself melting too. Alistair, in a last ditch effort, gives his life by jumping into the oasis with the stone. Indy emerges to find Alistair gone with the stone. Indy, Sallah, Alecia and Farqhuar head back to civilization.

Jones goes back home and finds out that the Crystal Skull had been stolen.

Characters
Indiana Jones – the adventurous archaeologist, protagonist
Sarducci – scholar, villain of the piece
Sallah – Indy's buddy
Nicolas Flamel – creator of the famed philosopher's stone. He is mentioned, but Indy only sees him once with his wife.

Release details
1995, USA, Bantam Doubleday Dell Publishing Group , Pub date ? April 1995, paperback (first edition)

See also

Indiana Jones (Prequels) - Bantam Books

External links
Indiana Jones Official website

1995 American novels
American adventure novels
Indiana Jones books
Fiction about alchemy